Hızarlı is a village in the Artvin District, Artvin Province, Turkey. Its population is 109 (2021).

Nearby towns
Dikmenli (3.9 km west) // Yukarımaden (7.6 km south west) // Zeytinlik (8.1 km north) // Oruçlu (7.5 km north west) // Okumuşlar (7.5 km north east) // Aşağımaden (8.2 km south west) // [all distances 'as the bird flies' and approximate].

References

Villages in Artvin District